Mari-Ann Kelam (born 26 June 1946 in Ansbach, Germany) is an Estonian politician. She was a member of IX Riigikogu.

She has been a member of Pro Patria Union.

References

Living people
1946 births
Isamaa politicians
Members of the Riigikogu, 1999–2003
Women members of the Riigikogu
Recipients of the Order of the National Coat of Arms, 3rd Class
21st-century Estonian politicians
Members of the Riigikogu, 2007–2011
21st-century Estonian women politicians